Angel Arch is the largest natural arch located within Canyonlands National Park, in San Juan County, Utah. Some consider it the most beautiful and spectacular arch in the park, if not the entire canyon country.  It is situated in a side canyon of Salt Creek Canyon, in the Needles District of the park. Precipitation runoff from Angel Arch drains north into the nearby Colorado River via Salt Creek. A 29-mile round-trip hike to Angel Arch leads to a viewpoint, and an additional 0.75-mile trail scrambles up into the arch opening. The arch's descriptive name comes from its resemblance to an angel with wings folded, and standing with its back to the arch opening. Before this feature's name was officially adopted in 1963 by the U.S. Board on Geographic Names, it was called Pegasus Arch. The first ascent was made in June 1993, by John Markel and Kevin Chase.

Geology
This geological formation is an eroded fin composed of Cedar Mesa Sandstone, which is the remains of coastal sand dunes deposited about 245–286 million years ago, during the early Permian period.

Climate
Spring and fall are the most favorable seasons to visit Angel Arch. According to the Köppen climate classification system, it is located in a Cold semi-arid climate zone, which is defined by the coldest month having an average mean temperature below −0 °C (32 °F) and at least 50% of the total annual precipitation being received during the spring and summer.

Gallery

See also
 Colorado Plateau
 Geology of Utah

References

External links

 Canyonlands National Park National Park Service
 Angel Arch weather forecast
 Angel Arch: YouTube
 1956 photo (as Pegasus Arch)

Landforms of San Juan County, Utah
Natural arches of San Juan County, Utah
Natural arches of Utah
Colorado Plateau
Canyonlands National Park
Sandstone formations of the United States